Paonessa is an Italian surname and may refer to:
Alessandra Paonessa, Canadian opera singer
Franco Paonessa, Italian footballer
Gabriele Paonessa, Italian footballer
Mario Paonessa, Italian footballer
Matthew Hurlow-Paonessa, American soccer player

Italian-language surnames